Junella was a fishing trawler, best known for her service with the Royal Navy (as mine countermeasures vessel HMS Junella) during the Falklands War.  She was built in 1975 for J Marr & Son, a Hull-based fishing company.  On 11 April 1982 she was taken up from trade by the British government and commissioned into the Royal Navy.  She was fitted with Second World War era minesweeping gear at Rosyth Dockyard, manned by Royal Navy sailors and allocated to the 11th Mine Countermeasures Squadron.  She sailed on 26 April but was unable to commence sweeping until after the 14 June Argentine surrender.  In the meantime she was utilised to transfer troops and stores between ships and landed special forces troops at San Carlos.  Demining operations commenced on 21 June.  Junella returned to the United Kingdom on 11 August, carrying a defused Argentine mine.

Junella was returned to commercial use after the war and in 1983 was sold to the Royal Greenland Trading Department, being renamed Siku.  She served with several other companies afterwards under the names Vesttraal  and Hill Cove before returning to the name Junella with SA (Fripur), fishing out of Montevideo, Uruguay.  After being damaged by fire she was scrapped on 19 July 1999.

Early career 
Junella was built for J Marr & Son, a Hull-based fishing company, in 1975. She was built on the Tyne at Wallsend by the Clelands Shipbuilding Company (part of Swan Hunter). She was the first trawler with thermal fluid heating built for the British fleet. She was the last freezer trawler built for the British fleet, until at least 1987.

On 28 October 1980 she struck rocks off Eilean Trodday, The Minch in Scotland during force 9 winds.  Her hull was damaged and she was drydocked at Hull for repairs.

Falklands War

Requisition and conversion 

When the British were planning the military response to the 2 April 1982 Argentine invasion of the Falkland Islands they suspected that they would need to deal with sea mines laid on the sea approaches.  A decision was made on 9 April to take up suitable ships from trade for use as mine countermeasures vessels.  The Royal Navy had a number of Ton-class minesweepers, designed for coastal work, but judged these too small to make the trip to the South Atlantic.  Three of the newly-built Hunt-class mine countermeasures vessels were in service but had insufficient range to reach the Falklands without being accompanied by a mother ship.  RMS St Helena was taken in hand for conversion to this role but would not be ready for the start of the campaign.  To fill the gap the navy looked to take up a number of deep sea fishing trawlers for conversion into mine countermeasures vessels.  They searched for vessels of between 1,200 and 1,500 tons displacement, capable of approximately 17 knots speed and with a fuel endurance of 60 days.  The J Marr & Son vessels Junella, Cordella, Farnella and Northella were chosen along with the British United Trawlers vessel Pict.

Junella was taken up from trade on 11 April and proceeded to Rosyth Dockyard for conversion to her new role. She was converted between 15 and 24 April, being fitted with Second World War vintage minesweeping equipment, which had been kept in storage by the navy. The mission was given more urgency on 12 April when a British submarine, HMS Spartan, confirmed the presence of moored mines in the Eastern approaches to Port Stanley. The vessel was commissioned into the Royal Navy as HMS Junella and assigned a crew drawn from the 1st Mine Countermeasures Squadron and the Fishery Protection Squadron. Junella'''s original merchant navy crew requested permission to accompany the vessel to the South Atlantic, either as civilians or by enlistment in the navy but were denied. A small number were retained on board until the vessel reached Freetown, Sierra Leone to train the navy crew. In Royal Navy service Junella was referred to as an Extra Deep Armed Team Sweep (EDATS) trawler and assigned to the 11th Mine Countermeasures Squadron. During the war she was commanded by Royal Navy Lieutenant Mark Rowledge.

 Service history Junella left Rosyth on 26 April, sailing for Portland Harbour in Dorset, where she underwent trials of her minesweeping gear.  She departed for the South Atlantic the following day, travelling via Freetown and Ascension Island. The threat of aerial attack was too severe for her to operate inshore in her minesweeping role.  In the meantime Junella and the other ships of the 11th Squadron were used to cross-transfer equipment and personnel between vessels of the taskforce.  Some  of equipment as well as troops were transferred off the ocean liner Queen Elizabeth 2; a difficult process as the trawlers struggled to stay close enough to the liner without damaging her hull.  The equipment was transferred by being passed along chains of soldiers through the corridors of the ship and out her side doors.  Junella also transferred members of the 5th Infantry Brigade from Queen Elizabeth 2 to Norland and Canberra in preparation for the landings at San Carlos.  The trawler was also used to transfer stores from Saxonia to ships of the Royal Fleet Auxiliary.  Junella was also used at San Carlos to land and take-off special forces troops of the Special Air Service and Special Boat Service a role for which she was described as ideal.

Argentine forces in the Falklands surrendered en-masse on 14 June and the capital, Port Stanley was reoccupied by British forces.  Amongst the paperwork discovered was a map of the naval minefields, this, together with the removal of the threat from Argentine aircraft, allowed minesweeping to commence on 21 June.  Junella and other ships of the squadron removed 10 of the 21 known mines before being relieved by the Hunt class minesweepers HMS Brecon and HMS Ledbury on 10 July.   The trawlers worked to sweep the minefield to cut the moorings after which the mines floated to the surface to be destroyed by rifle fire.  British naval command ordered that one of the mines be retained for later study.  The last of the mines swept by the trawlers, which had been cut from its moorings by Pict, was recovered by Gemini rigid inflatable boats and towed ashore at Bluff Cove on 26 June.  There it was made safe by Royal Navy experts (though the explosive was not removed) and found to be of German origin.  The mine was waterproofed and loaded onto Junella's deck for return to the UK.  To minimise risk of explosion while passing through the tropics the mine was kept cool under a water-soaked mattress.  Other ships were ordered to keep clear of Junella during the return journey.Junella returned to Rosyth on 11 August and the mine was offloaded and transferred to the Royal Naval Armaments Depot at nearby Crombie.  The detonator from this mine is retained in the collection of the Imperial War Museum.  Junella was afterwards converted back to civilian configuration and returned to service as a fishing vessel.  In recognition of her role during the war she was awarded the battle honour  "Falkland Islands 1982".

 Post-war career Junella was sold to the Royal Greenland Trading Department in 1983 and was refitted in Denmark.  Afterwards she was renamed Siku and fished for cod.  She later served with other companies, being renamed Vesttraal in 1985 and Hill Cove in 1987.  She returned to the name Junella after sale to SA (Fripur), a fishing company operating out of Montevideo, Uruguay.  Junella'' suffered major fire and was scrapped at San Antonio Oeste in Argentina on 19 July 1999.

References

Bibliography 

1975 ships
Ships built on the River Tyne
Ships built by Swan Hunter
Falklands War naval ships of the United Kingdom
Naval trawlers of the United Kingdom
Fishing vessels of the United Kingdom